November Criminals is a 2017 American crime drama film, directed by Sacha Gervasi and written by Gervasi and Steven Knight, and based on Sam Munson's 2010 novel The November Criminals. The film stars Ansel Elgort, Chloë Grace Moretz, Catherine Keener, and David Strathairn.

The film was released through video on demand on November 7, 2017, and opened in a limited release on December 8, 2017, by Stage 6 Films and Vertical Entertainment.

Plot 

The film opens with old footage of a young Addison Schacht and his mother playing at the beach. A voice over reveals that Addison's mother died of an aneurysm six months prior to the events of the movie.

In the present, teenaged Addison Schacht is delivering his application to the University of Chicago, along with his friend Phoebe Zeleny. After dropping off the envelope, the pair go to a local bakery for some coffee. There, they meet Kevin Broadus, who is a mutual friend of both Addison and Phoebe and an employee at the bakery. Once Addison and Phoebe get into their car, Phoebe admits that she is still a virgin, and would like them to lose their virginity together before they leave for college. Addison agrees and the two head to Phoebe's house to have sex. Shortly after they leave, an armed motorcyclist pulls up to the bakery and rushes inside with his gun drawn.

Phoebe's mother calls to inform her that there was a shooting at the bakery, and that Kevin was killed. Addison heads home, but stops at the bakery, which is now an active crime scene. Addison asks a news cameraman about the shooting, and the cameraman admits that it was most likely due to gang violence. Addison is confused because he believed Kevin was not the kind of person to be involved with a street gang.

Fed up with the authorities' dismissive claims about the shooting and his school's eagerness to forget about it, Addison starts his own investigation into Kevin's murder. He starts putting up posters around the school, asking anyone to call if they have more information about the shooting. Addison also steals Kevin's file from the school records, where he and Phoebe learn that Kevin was seeing the counselor because he seemed emotionally detached and distant. While at lunch one day, a student who was at the bakery the day Kevin was killed reveals that the shooter was white, and not black like the original police report said. The student also mentions that Kevin had been hanging out with a former student named Noel. Meanwhile, Addison is suspended for a week after administrators check his locker and find Kevin's stolen file.

Phoebe tells Addison about the information she received, and the two decide to visit Noel in his shady Washington D.C. neighborhood. The two meet Noel and his accomplice D Cash, who tells Addison that they will be in touch. Addison decides to visit Kevin's parents to see if they have any information about why Kevin was murdered. An angered Mr. Broadus assaults Addison, and reveals that Kevin became much more secretive in the last year, as well as having a severe drug problem. Addison is later contacted by Noel and D Cash again, and he is told to meet them at a bar. Addison attempts to get Phoebe to leave her mother's house party, but she declines. Addison admits his feelings for her and leaves to meet Noel and D Cash.

Noel and D Cash reveal that Kevin disrespected a powerful drug dealer at a nightclub several days before he was killed, and they agree to give Addison the name of a guy who was at the nightclub that night, as long as he makes a drug delivery to Chevy Chase (an affluent neighborhood they cannot get into). Addison delivers the drugs to a large mansion that belongs to Phoebe's friend Alex. After delivering the drugs, Addison receives the name of the man who was present at the nightclub, Mike Lorinner.

Addison calls Phoebe and tells her about Mike, and she implores Addison to call the police and let them handle the situation. Addison ignores her and arrives at Lorinner's house. Addison sets up a video camera to record the confrontation. When Lorinner opens the door, Addison questions him about the night at the club. He tells Addison to leave, but further presses him about how he found him. At the same time that Lorinner notices the red "record" light coming from the camera, Addison notices the same motorcycle that the shooter was reportedly riding. Lorinner holds Addison at gunpoint, and reveals that the drug dealer that Kevin disrespected was in fact D Cash. As the police arrive (presumably called by Phoebe), Addison rushes a momentarily distracted Lorinner, but Lorinner shoots him in the shoulder and runs off.

In the hospital, Addison recovers from his wound and reconciles with Phoebe, and Addison learns that Lorinner, D Cash, and Noel were all arrested by police. Later, Addison and Phoebe attend Kevin's funeral. Addison is accepted into the University of Chicago, but he will be away from Phoebe, who is attending Yale. In their final meeting before leaving for college, Phoebe hands Addison a letter, which is revealed to be a list of train times between Chicago and New Haven. Addison returns home, where he joins his dad in watching old videos of Mrs. Schacht.

Cast 
 Ansel Elgort as Addison Schacht, Phoebe's friend and love interest and Theo's son
 Chloë Grace Moretz as Phoebe "Digger" Zeleny, Addison's friend and love interest and Fiona's daughter
 David Strathairn as Theo Schacht, Addison's father
 Catherine Keener as Fiona Zeleny, Phoebe's mother
 Terry Kinney as Principal Karlstadt
 Cory Hardrict as D Cash
 Philip Ettinger as Mike Lorriner
 Danny Flaherty as Noel
 Victor Williams as Mr. Broadus, Kevin's father
 Opal Alladin as Mrs. Broadus, Kevin's mother
 Tessa Albertson as Alex Faustner
 Adrian Mompoint as Bo
 Jared Kemp as Kevin Broadus
 Georgia Lyman as Nurse
 Travis Leonard as Student with Glasses

Production

Casting
In November 2014, it was reported Chloë Grace Moretz and Catherine Keener had been cast in the film. In January 2015, Ansel Elgort was set to play the lead. David Strathairn also joined on March 23, 2015.

Filming 
Filming began on March 23, 2015 in Rhode Island and Washington D.C. and wrapped on April 28, 2015, after 32 days of filming.

Release
In January 2015, Sony Pictures Worldwide Acquisitions acquired North American and international distribution rights to the film. The film was released through video on demand on November 7, 2017, before opening in a limited release on December 8, 2017.

Critical response
On Rotten Tomatoes, the film has an approval rating of 0%, based on reviews from 11 critics, with an average rating of 3.46/10. On Metacritic, the film has a weighted average score of 31 out of 100, based on 5 reviews, indicating "generally unfavorable reviews".

Sheri Linden of The Hollywood Reporter wrote: "The starry chemistry of leads Ansel Elgort and Chloë Grace Moretz injects a modicum of energy into the coming-of-age drama, whose elements of romance, crime and smart-kid angst never coalesce."
Variety's Owen Gleiberman called it "a low-budget generic shrug of a movie, one that recycles clichés both ancient (testy drug dealers) and slightly less ancient (the hero films his life with a camcorder)."

Notes
Vertical Entertainment theatrically distributed the film, though did not receive marquee credit.

References

External links 
 

2017 crime drama films
2017 films
American crime drama films
Films shot in Rhode Island
Films shot in Washington, D.C.
Films with screenplays by Steven Knight
Stage 6 Films films
Vertical Entertainment films
2010s English-language films
Films directed by Sacha Gervasi
2010s American films